"Running Back" is a song by American rapper Wale featuring fellow American rapper Lil Wayne. Produced by Spinz Beats Inc., it was released as the fourth single from the former's fifth studio album, Shine (2017).

Background
Wale debuted the track while performing on ESPN's First Take series on January 3, 2017.

Chart performance
"Running Back" debuted at number 100 on US Billboard Hot 100 for the week of February 11, 2017.

Music video
The song's accompanying music video premiered on February 6, 2017 on Wale's account on YouTube. The music video was directed by ACRS. Since its release, the video has received over 14 million views.

Charts

Release history

References

External links
Lyrics of this song

2017 singles
2017 songs
Wale (rapper) songs
Maybach Music Group singles
Atlantic Records singles
Songs written by Wale (rapper)
Lil Wayne songs
Songs written by Lil Wayne
Songs written by DJ Spinz